This is a list of United States Air Force defense systems evaluation squadrons.  It covers units that were part of the inactivated Aerospace Defense Command (ADCOM) and serves as a break out of the comprehensive List of United States Air Force squadrons.

See also
 List of United States Air Force squadrons

References

  A Handbook of Aerospace Defense Organization 1946 - 1980,  by Lloyd H. Cornett and Mildred W. Johnson, Office of History, Aerospace Defense Center, Peterson Air Force Base, Colorado

External links

Defense systems evaluation